Mo'men (  , literally means "Believer") is a chain of fast food restaurants based in Cairo, Egypt, specializing in sandwiches. Mo'men is a wholly owned subsidiary of the Mo'men Group.

History
At that time, Egypt was opening itself to international franchises and many were waiting for the arrival of American fast food chains such as McDonald's and KFC. However, local fast food chains such as Mo'men started catering to that market demand. Today, Mo'men Restaurants' chain is steadily becoming one of the large restaurants chains in Egypt in terms of average sales and number of customers per restaurant, with 57 restaurants serving over ten million customers a year. Mo’men restaurants are serving more than double the number of customers and achieving double the sales per restaurant, if compared with any of the international chains operating in Egypt.

Locations in Egypt
There are currently 62 Mo'men locations in Egypt covering all of Cairo and Alexandria's cities as well as other locations in the country.

International locations
Mo'men recently opened locations in Libya, Sudan, Dubai, Kuwait, Bahrain, Saudi Arabia,  and Malaysia.

Factory
In October 1999, the construction of Mo'men's factory began. The factory was built with the production capacity of 1.5 tons per hour and is considered one of the largest in the Middle East.
The factory is 12,000 m2  and consists of:
 Fully automated production lines to process the full range of beef, poultry and seafood products
 Bakery
 Dry and cold stores
 Quality control laboratories

Actis Deal
On July 30, 2008, Actis Capital, a leading private equity investor in emerging markets, has completed a deal to invest US$48.5 million in Mo'men Group. Actis's US$48.5 million investment in Mo'men will help the group pursue its planned expansion throughout northern Africa and the Persian Gulf region.
and now mo'men also opened new branches in Sudan, gulf countries, Libya and even Malaysia.

See also
 Cook Door
 List of fast food restaurants in Egypt

References

External links
 Mo'men Group's homepage

Fast-food chains of Egypt
Restaurants established in 1988
Egyptian brands
Companies based in Cairo